St James' Church, Codnor is a Church of England parish church in Codnor, Derbyshire.

History
The church was built in 1844 to the designs of architect Robert Barker. It was consecrated on 10 October 1844.

The chancel was added in 1888–90 by J Holden.

Organ
The original pipe organ was enlarged and improved in 1876 by Charles Lloyd of Nottingham, but it was given to St Andrew's Church, Langar in 1906. A replacement pipe organ by Abbott and Smith was installed in 1906. A specification of the organ can be found on the National Pipe Organ Register.

See also
Listed buildings in Codnor

References

Codnor
Churches completed in 1844
Codnor